Moitrelia italogallicella is a species of snout moth described by Pierre Millière in 1882. It is found in Spain, France, Italy and on Malta.

References

Moths described in 1882
Phycitini
Moths of Europe